Allan Ivo Steel (1892–1917) was an English cricketer.

Allan Steel was born in Toxteth Park, Liverpool, the son of the Lancashire cricketer A. G. Steel. He attended Eton College, and played in Fowler's match in 1910.

As a right-handed batsman and a right-arm slow bowler, he represented Marylebone Cricket Club (MCC) and also Middlesex in two first-class matches in 1912.

He served as a lieutenant of the 2nd Battalion Coldstream Guards regiment of the British Army and was killed on active service during World War I, aged 25. His name is on the Tyne Cot Memorial, Zonnebeke, West-Vlaanderen, Belgium, Panel 9 to 10.

His brother was John "Jack" Steel, who served in the Royal Navy. He drowned. His memorial is at the Portsmouth Naval Memorial.

Their mother was Georgina Dorothy, née Thomas, (17 May 1864 – 6 October 1943); she descended from the family who included Commander William George Henry Skyring (born c. 1797) who was on  surveying South America, and who surveying the west coast of Africa was murdered on Cape Roxo on 23 December 1833.

References

External links
 Profile

1892 births
1917 deaths
People educated at Eton College
Coldstream Guards officers
British Army personnel of World War I
British military personnel killed in World War I
English cricketers
Marylebone Cricket Club cricketers
Middlesex cricketers
Cricketers from Liverpool